Tetyana Viktorivna Skachko born 18 August 1954 in Voroshilovgrad, Ukrainian SSR) is a retired long jumper who represented the USSR. She won the bronze medal at the 1980 Summer Olympics in Moscow with a jump of 7.01 metres.

References

1954 births
Athletes (track and field) at the 1980 Summer Olympics
Olympic athletes of the Soviet Union
Olympic bronze medalists for the Soviet Union
Living people
Soviet female long jumpers
Ukrainian female long jumpers
Sportspeople from Luhansk
Medalists at the 1980 Summer Olympics
Olympic bronze medalists in athletics (track and field)
Universiade medalists in athletics (track and field)
Universiade bronze medalists for the Soviet Union